Vučina Šćepanović (Serbian Cyrillic: Вучина Шћепановић; born 17 November 1982) is a Serbian footballer.

Club career
He had previously played with Serbian clubs Priština, Bečej, Sartid Smederevo and Hajduk Beograd, Montenegrin Mogren, Bosnian Slavija Sarajevo, Ukrainian Kryvbas Kryvyi Rih and Macedonian Makedonija Gjorče Petrov.

References

External links
Profile at Asnex.Tripod

Living people
1982 births
Sportspeople from Pristina
Serbian footballers
Association football forwards
FC Prishtina players
FK Vardar players
FK Smederevo players
FK Hajduk Beograd players
Serbian expatriate footballers
Expatriate footballers in North Macedonia
FK Makedonija Gjorče Petrov players
Expatriate footballers in Ukraine
FC Kryvbas Kryvyi Rih players
Ukrainian Premier League players
Expatriate footballers in Bosnia and Herzegovina
FK Slavija Sarajevo players
FK Sarajevo players
HŠK Zrinjski Mostar players